The third season of Melrose Place, an American television series, premiered on Fox on September 12, 1994. The season three finale aired on May 22, 1995, after 32 episodes. 

The season was produced by Chip Hayes, co-producer Kimberly Costello, supervising producer Carol Mendelsohn, co-executive producer Frank South and executive producers Aaron Spelling, E. Duke Vincent and Darren Star.

With this season, the show moved from a Wednesday night time slot to Monday nights on FOX. This was announced with a memorable ad campaign featuring Heather Locklear with the words "Mondays are a bitch".

Storylines
Jane and Sydney are blamed for Michael's hit-and-run accident, which leaves him with amnesia. Although he regains his memory (and realizes that Kimberly is his attempted murderer), they reconcile and marry in Las Vegas.

Jo is embroiled in a custody battle with the Carters (Reed's parents), who want to take their (yet unborn) grandchild away from the woman who "murdered" their son. Although Kimberly seems to help Jo by faking the baby's death so Jo can escape with her son, she steals the baby because she cannot have children of her own. When Jo reports Kimberly and Michael to Wilshire Hospital chief of staff Peter Burns (Jack Wagner), Michael returns the child. Kimberly tells the Carters that Jo's baby is alive, and they hire a nanny to steal the baby. After Jo is shot in the back while tracking them down, she decides to surrender her son for adoption.

Matt briefly reunites with Jeffrey, who tells him that he was discharged from the Navy when he tested HIV-positive. Matt is uncomfortable with Jeffrey's lust for life, and they break up. He becomes involved with married, closeted plastic surgeon Paul Graham (David Beecroft), who murders his wife in the season finale and frames Matt.

Unable to exonerate herself for Michael's attempted murder, Sydney became an outcast from this point onward for the rest of the series. After her imprisonment, Jane had her committed to a mental hospital before employing her in a work-release program. Sydney is sexually harassed and abused by Chris Marchette, Jane's sociopathic Australian business associate. After embezzling most of the funds from Jane's business, Chris fled the country after losing the stolen money gambling in Las Vegas (with Sydney his hostage).

Sydney returns to waitressing at Shooters and grows closer to Jake. However, their relationship disintegrates when Jake learns that Sydney slept with Chris to protect him from an attack by an associate. When Sydney advertises for a roommate to help pay the rent, Rikki (Traci Lords) moves in. A conniving sociopath, Rikki convinces the Melrose residents that Sydney is destroying their possessions and encourages her to join a cult led by Martin Abbott (Remy Zada). When Sydney tries to leave the cult, she is kidnapped and Jane and Jake free her. Jealous of their romance, Sydney reverts to her devious self and breaks them up and avenges herself on Michael and Kimberly by extortion (using the money to control Jane's design business). Although Jane fights back, her business goes into foreclosure and she joins MacKenzie Hart Designs—where she becomes involved with co-owner Richard Hart (Patrick Muldoon).

Jake buys Reed Carter's boat but it is destroyed when Amanda's fugitive father (Palmer) returns and hired a contract killer, named Brittany (Kathy Ireland), to murder Jake for making him lose his business. Brittany, however, plans to kill Palmer and escape with his money and Jake. When Jake refuses to go along Brittany blows up the boat, apparently killing him. However, Jake jumped overboard and is rescued. He buys Shooters with a $50,000 FBI reward for his help in the Palmer Woodward case (leading to the off-screen arrest of Brittany and the recovery of Palmer's money).

Jake reconciles with Jo and reunites with his auto-mechanic half-brother, Jess (Dan Cortese), when their mother dies in their hometown. Jess follows Jake to Los Angeles, getting involved with Jo and arranging for Jake to be shot in an armed robbery at Shooters so Jess could take over Jake's business. Although Jo did not believe Jake that Jess arranged the shooting, when she asks Jess how he could afford an engagement ring when he proposes to her, he attacks her. When Jake learns about the attack in the season finale he and Jess fight, falling off the edge of a high platform at a construction site.

Alison's reluctance to marry Billy after the revelation about her father leads to Billy ending the relationship as Alison becomes an alcoholic. Since he still cares for her, Billy arranges for Alison to enter rehab and begins working at D & D copywriter. Amanda becomes involved with Wilshire Memorial's chief of staff Peter Burns, who helps her take over D & D by buying stock.  When D & D president Bruce Teller (Stanley Kamel) is ousted he commits suicide, and Amanda replaces him. Peter conspires to remove Amanda in favor of his old girlfriend, Caitlin (Jasmine Guy); he engineers a fake appendicitis attack and tries to kill Amanda on the operating table, when Michael rescues her and he is arrested.

Amanda discovers that she has lymphoma, and is replaced at D & D by Alison. However, Alison could not cope with the sudden responsibility and workload and she quickly became aggressive, ruthless, heartless, and assertive just like Amanda. While treating her, Michael begins to fall for Amanda and they have a brief affair (enraging Kimberly). Amanda ends the affair when she recovers, teaming up with the conniving intern Brooke Armstrong (Kristin Davis) to reclaim D & D. Brooke becomes involved with Billy and sends Alison to Hong Kong on business. After helping Amanda force Alison from D & D, Brooke begins plotting to take over the company. She marries Billy in the season finale when Alison interrupts the ceremony to beg Billy for another chance.

After she is sued for divorce, Kimberly frames Michael for assaulting her. He is bailed out by Peter Burns (who got out of prison for Amanda's attempted murder), who needs his and Kimberly's help to retain his medical license. Peter seduces Kimberly so she will testify in his favor, but his appeal is unsuccessful. Realizing that Peter used her, and hallucinating, Kimberly plants four firebombs in the apartment complex. Due to the April 1995 Oklahoma City bombing, one month before the episode aired, the bombing did not appear onscreen until the beginning of season four.

Cast

Main cast members
In alphabetical order
 Josie Bissett as Jane Mancini 
 Thomas Calabro as Michael Mancini 
 Laura Leighton as Sydney Andrews 
 Doug Savant as Matt Fielding 
 Grant Show as Jake Hanson 
 Andrew Shue as Billy Campbell 
 Courtney Thorne-Smith as Alison Parker 
 Daphne Zuniga as Jo Reynolds

Special guest star
 Heather Locklear as Amanda Woodward

Recurring guest stars

 Marcia Cross as Dr. Kimberly Shaw
 Tracy Nelson as Meredith Parker
 Kathy Ireland as Brittany Maddocks
 Carmen Argenziano as Dr. Stanley Levin
 Monte Markham as John Parker
 Dorothy Fielding as Mrs. Parker
 Wayne Tippit as Palmer Woodward
 Meg Wittner as Nancy Donner
 Stanley Kamel as Bruce Teller
 Andrew Williams as Chris Marchette
 Ken Howard as George Andrews
 Penny Fuller as Marilyn Carter
 Jerry Hardin as Dennis Carter
 Carl Strano as Bob McGovern
 Jack Wagner as Peter Burns
 Cheryl Pollak as Susan Madsen
 Jason Beghe as Jeffrey Lindley
 John Saxon as Henry Waxman
 Brian Bloom as Zack Phillips
 David Newsom as Williams
 James Handy as Matt Fielding Sr.
 Claudette Nevins as Constance Fielding
 Ana Mercedes as Maria
 David James Elliott as Terry Parsons
 Jasmine Guy as Caitlin Mills
 Traci Lords as Rikki
 Ramy Zada as Martin Abbot
 John Sanderford as Dr. Barnett
 Tom Schanley as Det. John Rawlings
 Francis Xavier McCarthy as Dr. Calvin Hobbs
 Kristin Davis as Brooke Armstrong
 Dan Cortese as Jess Hanson
 Perry King as Hayley Armstrong
 David Beecroft as Dr. Paul Graham 
 Dana Sparks as Carol Graham 
 Zitto Kazann as Henry
 Patrick Muldoon as Richard Hart 
 Morgan Brittany as MacKenzie Hart

Episodes

References

1994 American television seasons
1995 American television seasons